John Stirling (1677–1736) was an early 18th-century Scottish merchant who served as Lord Provost of Glasgow from 1728 to 1730.

Life

As a merchant he traded with Virginia and the Caribbean so is presumed to have traded in tobacco and sugar but there is no mention of his owning any plantations there.

He served as Baillie in 1716 and 1724
and was elected Lord Provost of Glasgow in 1728 being succeeded by Peter Murdoch of Rosehill in 1730.

He died in Glasgow in 1736.

Family

He married Isabella Hunter. Their children included William Stirling (b.1717), founder of William Stirling & Sons calico printers. He was uncle to Walter Stirling founder of the Stirling Library in Glasgow. His daughter Janet Stirling married the Glasgow goldsmith Robert Luke.

Artistic recognition

He was portrayed by William Aikman around 1720.

References
 

1677 births
1736 deaths
Businesspeople from Glasgow
Lord Provosts of Glasgow